Cheer is the third studio album by American post-hardcore band Drug Church. The album was released on November 2, 2018, through Pure Noise Records.

Track listing

Personnel 
Drug Church
 Nick Cogan - electric guitar
 Cory Galusha - electric guitar
 Patrick Kindlon - vocals
 Chris Villeneuve - drums
 Patrick Wynne - bass

Additional personnel

 Anne Elisabeth Grushecky - design
 Mike Kalajian - mastering
 Jon Markson - producing, recording, mixing
 Maria Serrano - artwork
 Mitchell Wojcik - photography

Critical reception 

Cheer received critical acclaim upon its release. On review aggregator website, Metacritic, Cheer has an average critic score of 84 out of 100, indicating "universal acclaim
based on four critic reviews".

References 

2018 albums
Drug Church albums
Pure Noise Records albums